{{DISPLAYTITLE:C20H29NO}}
The molecular formula C20H29NO (molar mass: 299.45 g/mol, exact mass: 299.2249 u) may refer to:

 Gemazocine (R-15,497)
 Ibazocine
 2-Propanoyl-3-(4-isopropylphenyl)-tropane

Molecular formulas